Anvil Point is part of the Jurassic Coast on the Isle of Purbeck in Dorset, England. Anvil Point Lighthouse is located on the point.

Geology
Anvil Point is in the eastern part of the Portland limestone and the Purbeck beds that stretches from Durlston Head to St. Aldhelm's Head. For a long time the cliffs along this stretch of coast were quarried at Tilly Whim Caves, Dancing Ledge, Seacombe and Winspit.

Leisure
Local leisure activities include walking and rock climbing.

References

Isle of Purbeck
History of Dorset
Jurassic Coast
Swanage